John Anders Johnson (April 15, 1832November 10, 1901) was a Norwegian American immigrant, businessman, and Republican politician.  He served in the Wisconsin State Senate and Assembly, representing eastern Dane County.

Biography
Johnson was born in Telemark, Norway, on April 15, 1832, as the eldest of the five children of Anders Johnson (1804–1880) and his wife, Aaste Killing Koven (1808–1893). His family immigrated to the United States in 1844, traveling via New York to reach Milwaukee. In 1852, the family to Pleasant Springs, Wisconsin. He married Karen Kristie Thompson in 1856. They had a daughter before her death in 1860. On October 31, 1861, Johnson married Kaia Nicoline Marie Kildahl. They had six children. He died of a stomach ulcer on November 10, 1901, and was buried at Forest Hill Cemetery.

Career
Johnson was a member of the Assembly in 1857. He served as Clerk of Dane County, Wisconsin, from 1861 to 1869. From 1873 to 1874, he was a member of the Senate. Other positions Johnson held include Town Clerk and Town Chairman of Pleasant Springs and justice of the peace.

Outside politics Johnson owned Fuller & Johnson, a company that produced farm machinery, having previously been a farmer.

Electoral history

| colspan="6" style="text-align:center;background-color: #e9e9e9;"| General Election, November 5, 1872

References

External links

Historic Madison.Inc-John Anders Johnson

Politicians from Telemark
Norwegian emigrants to the United States
People from Pleasant Springs, Wisconsin
Businesspeople from Wisconsin
Farmers from Wisconsin
Republican Party Wisconsin state senators
Republican Party members of the Wisconsin State Assembly
Mayors of places in Wisconsin
City and town clerks
County clerks in Wisconsin
American justices of the peace
American Lutherans
1832 births
1901 deaths
Deaths from ulcers
Burials in Wisconsin
19th-century American politicians
19th-century American judges
19th-century Lutherans